Girl is the debut studio album by Australian rock band Eskimo Joe, released on 20 August 2001. The album reached number 29 on the Australian (ARIA) Album Charts and was certified gold.

At the ARIA Music Awards of 2001, the album was nominated for ARIA Award for Breakthrough Artist – Album.

The album features the two heavily played Triple J songs "Wake Up" and "Who Sold Her Out", with the latter reaching number 94 on the ARIA Singles Charts. "Sydney Song" featured on an advertisement for Kit Kat, in which a man carried a novelty sized Kit Kat around, to promote the Kit Kat Chunky. This also assisted in sales of the band's album, Girl.

Track listing

Charts

Release history

References

Eskimo Joe albums
2001 debut albums
Albums produced by Ed Buller